The Union of Communist Parties – Communist Party of the Soviet Union (UCP–CPSU) is a federation of communist parties in the post-Soviet states founded in 1993.

Gennady Zyuganov has been the organisation's chairman since 2001. He replaced Oleg Shenin, who split off a part of the UCP–CPSU as the "Communist Party of the Soviet Union".

Composition of the UPC–CPSU
The structure of the UCP-CPSU consists of 17 communist parties within the former Soviet Union.

Members

See also
 All-Union Communist Party of Bolsheviks (1991)
 All-Union Communist Party (Bolsheviks) (1995)
 Communist Party of the Soviet Union
 Communist Party of the Soviet Union (1992)
 Communist Party of the Soviet Union (2001)
 Essence of Time

Notes

References

External links
Union of Communist Parties – Communist Party of the Soviet Union website (Russian)

1993 establishments in Russia
Communist Party of the Russian Federation
Communist Party of Ukraine
International Meeting of Communist and Workers Parties
Left-wing internationals
Left-wing political party alliances
Neo-Sovietism
Party of Communists of the Republic of Moldova
Political parties established in 1993